"Expressway to Your Heart" is a song written by Kenny Gamble and Leon Huff and performed by the Soul Survivors.  It appeared on their 1967 album, When the Whistle Blows Anything Goes, which was produced by Gamble and Huff.

The song reached #3 on the R&B chart and #4 on the Billboard Hot 100 in 1967,  and was ranked #18 on Billboard magazine's Top Hot 100 songs of 1967.

Other versions
Gil Now recorded a cover with French lyrics titled "Les Oiseaux dans la ville" in 1968. 
Don Bryant covered the song on his album Precious Soul.
The Vibrations released a version of the song, again with Gamble & Huff producing, in 1969 on Neptune Records.
Amen Corner released the song as the B-side to their single "Judge Rumpel Crassila" in 1969 in the Netherlands.
Jerry Garcia and Merl Saunders recorded a version of the song in 1973.
Margo Thunder released the song as a single in 1975.  It reached #25 on the R&B chart.
Mike Finnigan released the song as a single in 1978.
The Blues Brothers released the song as a single in 1981.
Breakfast Club released a version as a single in 1988.  It reached #30 on the Dance chart in 1989.
King Tee sampled The Soul Survivors version on their song "Do Your Thing" which was featured on their 1990 album, At Your Own Risk.
Bruce Springsteen sang the song on his 2009 Working on a Dream Tour.
Southside Johnny and the Asbury Jukes

In popular culture
The 1987 film Adventures in Babysitting featured a version of the song performed by Southside Johnny and the Asbury Jukes.
The 1987 Disney Channel TV special D-TV: Doggone Valentine used the Soul Survivors version, shown with clips of Goofy and other Disney cartoon dog characters in their cars, fighting their way through various traffic jams.
The Soul Survivors version was used in the 1996 movie, Striptease.

References

1967 songs
1967 debut singles
1969 singles
1975 singles
1978 singles
1981 singles
1988 singles
Songs written by Leon Huff
Songs written by Kenny Gamble
The Blues Brothers songs
Southside Johnny & The Asbury Jukes songs
MCA Records singles
Columbia Records singles
Atlantic Records singles